Frank Gryner is a Canadian record producer, mix engineer, audio technician, and multi-instrumentalist. He has mixed/engineered or performed on recordings for multiplatinum artist Rob Zombie, as well as A Perfect Circle, BT, Peter Pepper, and Andrew W.K. among many others.

Biography
Gryner grew up in Forest, Lambton County, Ontario. He is half Irish and half Filipino. He began as a Rock guitarist and picked up his knowledge of producing from the studios where his band recorded demos.

Gryner has worked with a wide spectrum of artists including Tommy Lee, John 5, and his own sister Emm Gryner. He has coordinated with producer Scott Humphrey on many projects including the works done in the Chop Shop such as Hellbilly Deluxe by Rob Zombie.

In 2014, Gryner joined his sister Emm Gryner's side project, Trapper, with Sean Kelly (on guitar), Emm (on vocals), Jordan Kern (on bass) and Tim Timleck (ex-Universal Honey on drums), playing "1980s-style melodic hard rock." In May 2015, Trapper opened for Brit-rockers Def Leppard on 3 Canadian tour dates in Montréal, Ottawa and London, Ontario. Emm Gryner had met and become friends with Def Leppard lead singer Joe Elliot when she toured as a backing singer with David Bowie. 

On May 29, 2015, Trapper played the Great Hall in Toronto with special guest Chris Hadfield singing two songs with the band. 

On May 11, 2016, Frank Gryner directed a video for Def Leppard, for the song "Man Enough," filmed in Little Rock, Arkansas. 

He also writes articles relative to the music industry which are featured in periodicals and online sites such as Premier Guitar, and  Recording.

Gryner currently produces recordings out of his own God Complex production studio in Ontario.

Software
Gryner is Vice President of Operations  for the recording app called Jammit, a company he runs with CEO Scott Humphrey and others. Jammit is an iPhone application that utilizes the master recordings from various artists in the music industry. Featured artists include Alice Cooper, Foreigner, No Doubt, Nickelback, Sum 41, Godsmack and many more. Jammit is available for iOS devices  and Mac OS X.  The app has won multiple industry awards.

Gryner co-created the thepublicrecord.com, which sourced the general public for track contributions to produce one of the largest scale collaboration albums ever produced, Tommy Lee's Methods of Mayhem album, A Public Disservice Announcement.  Over the lifetime of the site contributing artists included Deadmau5, Rob Zombie, John 5, Steve Vai, and Black Veil Brides among many others.

On April 1, 2012, Gryner announced the staff's decision to close TPR indefinitely, citing technical and resource challenges.

Personal life
Gryner has lived in Los Angeles, California and currently resides in Canada.

Discography

Albums
 L7 - "Hungry for Stink" (1994) Recording engineer
 Skold - "Skold" (1996) Engineer 
 Powerman 5000 - Tonight the Stars Revolt! (1997) Mixing 
 Rob Zombie - Hellbilly Deluxe (1998) Mixing, Engineer 
 Methods of Mayhem - Methods of Mayhem (1999) Mixing 
 Rob Zombie - American Made Music to Strip By (1999) Engineer 
 A Perfect Circle - "Mer De Noms" (2000) Drum Engineer 
 Rob Zombie - The Sinister Urge (2001) Engineer, Guitar 
 Andrew W.K. - The Wolf (2003) Engineer
 Spineshank - Self-Destructive Pattern (2003) Engineer
 Rob Zombie - Past, Present & Future (2003) Engineer, Mixing
 Methods of Mayhem - A Public Disservice Announcement (2010) Engineer 
 Peter Pepper - "Vs. The Great Whatever" (2012) Mixing, Engineer, Guitar

References

Living people
Musicians from Ontario
Canadian record producers
Place of birth missing (living people)
Canadian rock guitarists
Canadian male guitarists
Year of birth missing (living people)